Vicente Arraya Castro (25 January 1922 – 21 November 1992) was a Bolivian football goalkeeper who played for Bolivia in the 1950 FIFA World Cup. He also played for Ferroviario La Paz, and 8 matches for Club Atlético Atlanta of Argentina, in 1944-45. He was the first Bolivian player in the Argentina First Division. He managed the national team in 1959.

References

External links
FIFA profile

1921 births
1992 deaths
People from Oruro, Bolivia
Bolivian footballers
Bolivian expatriate footballers
Bolivia international footballers
Association football goalkeepers
1949 South American Championship players
1950 FIFA World Cup players
Club Atlético Atlanta footballers
Expatriate footballers in Argentina
Bolivian expatriate sportspeople in Argentina
Bolivian football managers
Bolivia national football team managers